P. Michael Forrester (born February 5, 1951) is an American politician. He is a former member of the South Carolina House of Representatives from the 34th District, serving from 2008 to 2020. He is a member of the Republican party.

References

Living people
1951 births
Republican Party members of the South Carolina House of Representatives
21st-century American politicians